Lilia Guadalupe Mendiola Mayares (born December 12, 1952), better known by her stage name Lyn May, is a Mexican vedette, exotic dancer and actress. She was one of the most popular Mexican vedettes during the 1970s and 1980s, a popular sex symbol, and one of the main stars of Ficheras cinema.

Early years 
Born in Nuxco, Tecpan De Galeana, Guerrero, Mexico. She is of Chinese ancestry. During her childhood, Lilia helped with household expenses by selling souvenirs to tourists. She would eventually go on to work as a waitress in a restaurant where she met her first husband, an American sailor 30 years her senior, with whom she settled in Mexico City. After five years of marriage and the birth of their two daughters, Lilia separated from her husband alleging domestic violence and sexual abuse.

Career
Back in Acapulco, Lilia began to work in the cabaret El Zorro, as a dancer. Eventually she worked at the Tropicana cabaret in Acapulco, where she alternated with the popular Mexican comedian Germán Valdés "Tin Tan".
After her successful season with Tin Tan, Lilia traveled to Mexico City, where television presenter Raul Velasco hired her as a dancer in the program Siempre en Domingo. There, she joined the program's ballet, headed by the popular vedette Olga Breeskin. On the TV show, Lilia learned, with a professional instructor, to dance tribal, Hawaiian, and Tahitian dances.

In 1970, Lilia was hired by the businessman Enrique Lombardini, who at that time managed the Teatro Esperanza Iris. However, the young dancer was not prepared for the kind of burlesque shows that were taking place in the city theater. According to Lyn May, the first day she stepped on the stage of the Teatro Iris, she was heavily booed by attendees, who, accustomed to the artistic nudes of vedettes like Gloriella and Cleopatra, protested the musical number of the young aspirant to vedette.

After battling for a week at the Teatro Iris, Lilia performed her first nude, causing a furor among the male audience. Lombardini bestowed on her the pseudonym "Lyn May: The Goddess of Love." As a vedette, Lyn May included singing in her shows in nightclubs and cabarets.

She had a long stay at the Teatro Blanquita in Mexico City. In 1974, filmmaker Alberto Isaac chose Lyn as one of the main protagonists of the famous film Tívoli, which portrays with nostalgia the nocturnal atmosphere of Mexico City in the 1940s and 1950s. With the success of the film, Lyn became fully incorporated into Mexican Cinema, particularly the genre known as Ficheras film of the 1970s and 1980s. But in the late 1980s, this film genre declined in popularity, forcing May to retire from the stage. In 1991, she participated in the telenovela Yo no creo en los hombres, produced by Televisa.

In 1998, May's career resurfaced after participating in the music video of the song Mr. P. Mosh by Mexican rock band Plastilina Mosh. She also began to appear frequently as a guest on the Univision television show El Gordo y La Flaca. In 2016 also appeared in a music video of the song Si tu me quisieras, of the Chilean singer Mon Laferte.

She currently works as a Tahitian dance instructor at the Plaza Caribe Hotel in Cancun, Mexico and gives performances on weekends in the bar of the same establishment.

In 2016, Lyn was featured in the documentary film Beauties of the Night, by the filmmaker María José Cuevas, along with other vedettes like Olga Breeskin, Rossy Mendoza, Wanda Seux and Princesa Yamal.

Personal life
During the peak of her career, she was involved with important politicians and business leaders. May has said she had an affair with a former President of Mexico, but did not name him. The President is speculated to be José López Portillo, who also had an affair with, and later married actress Sasha Montenegro. May had a ten-year relationship with film producer Guillermo Calderón.

Shortly after ending things with Calderón, May married businessman Antonio Chi Su. The couple opened a Chinese restaurant on Avenida Bucareli in Mexico City. Chi Su was diagnosed with prostate cancer in 2004 and died in 2008.

In August 2021, the media reported that May got pregnant at 68 years old, the father reportedly is her 29-year old fiancée Marcos D1. She announced the message of her pregnancy on Instagram which caused controversies among internauts and tabloid journalists.

Selected filmography
 Carnival Nights (1978)
 The Loving Ones (1979)
 Spicy Chile (1983)
 Beauties of the Night (documentary) (2016)

References 

 Spanish-language interview with biographical information
 Spanish-language interview where she describes being abused as a child, and being a prostitute

External links 
 

Living people
Burlesque performers
Mexican erotic dancers
Mexican film actresses
Mexican vedettes
Mexican people of Chinese descent
People from Acapulco
Actresses from Guerrero
Actresses of Chinese descent
1952 births
20th-century Mexican dancers
21st-century Mexican dancers
20th-century Mexican actresses
21st-century Mexican actresses